Marcia Trotman (born 1 September 1955) is a Barbadian sprinter. She competed in the women's 200 metres at the 1972 Summer Olympics.

References

1955 births
Living people
Athletes (track and field) at the 1972 Summer Olympics
Barbadian female sprinters
Olympic athletes of Barbados
Athletes (track and field) at the 1974 British Commonwealth Games
Commonwealth Games competitors for Barbados
Place of birth missing (living people)
Olympic female sprinters